John Peebles (1872 – January 5, 1948) was a Canadian politician.

Born in Albion Corners, Ontario, Peebles moved to Hamilton as a small child, and eventually established a jewellery business.  He was elected as an alderman covering the city at large in 1908.  He ran for the Hamilton East seat in the House of Commons in 1911 as a Liberal, but was defeated by incumbent Samuel Barker.  He received only 32.6% of the vote.

For several years, he sat on the cemetery board.  In 1925, he was again elected, this time as alderman for Ward 3.  From 1926 to 1929, he sat on the board of control.

In 1930, he was acclaimed as mayor.  He subsequently won re-election three times, until he was defeated in 1934 by Herbert Earl Wilton.

1872 births
1948 deaths
Mayors of Hamilton, Ontario
Candidates in the 1911 Canadian federal election
Liberal Party of Canada candidates for the Canadian House of Commons